is a concept of one's bodily tendency in sensitivity, temperament, movement and personality. Noguchi said that man's tendency of sensitivity can be divided into five categories, each of which is divided into two types, one of which is active (odd-numbered types) whereas the other of which is passive (even-numbered types). In addition, there are two anomalous types. Thus, 12 types of Taiheki in total have been defined. Among them, odd-numbered types have a tendency to release compressed energy in an active way, whereas even-numbered types are passive and require others' attention to release compressed energy. The 12 types are like pure colours in colour, and there is a combination of two types in one person (this is called complex Taiheki).

The concept of Taiheki is somehow similar to the typology by Ernst Kretschmer, Enneagram of Personality and Four Temperaments. However, Taiheki is not only applicable to psychological aspects such as one's emotional or behavioural tendencies, but also to one's physical characteristics including the shape of face and body, balance of weights, and tendency seen in movement. According to him, all these aspects are correlated with the state of 5 lumbar vertebrae. In Japanese,  means “body”, whereas  represents “habit” or "tendency". Noguchi established the concept of Taiheki through his activity as a healer and Seitai teacher sometime during the early 1950s.

A modified weight scale called  (body mass distribution meter) is used to tell somebody's Taiheki. The scale's platform is divided into left and right parts for both legs, and each of the parts is further divided into 3 parts: frontal right, frontal left, and rear parts. Thus one stands over the 6 parts of the platform. When he makes postures, such as brace and forward-bending position, the scale gives data on the biased balance of his weight in a certain direction for each posture. According to Noguchi, each Taiheki has a distinct tendency to the biased balance of weight in each posture. One can hence determine somebody's Taiheki based on the collected data.

Alternatively, without using any special apparatus, one's Taiheki can be estimated by observation of his/her physical constitution, postural characteristics, kinetic features, or psychological tendency in sensitivity
.

Noguchi's seitai provides exercises specifically designed for each Taiheki, to adjust its unbalanced tendency when it is excessive. It is thought that in general one's Taiheki doesn't change dramatically in adulthood. Noguchi himself was Taiheki type 9 mixed with twisted type, whereas his wife, Akiko Noguchi was Taiheki type 1.

12 types of Taiheki

Release and Attention - Odd-numbered Taiheki and Even-numbered Taiheki
Odd-numbered Taiheki of 1, 3, 5, 7, 9, and 11 are considered to be the types that can proactively dissipate excess energy.
Even-numbered Taiheki of 2, 4, 6, 8, 10, and 12 are less likely to dissipate their surplus energy, are more susceptible to their surroundings and desire the attention of others when they lack energy.

Classification of the 12 types of Taiheki
Taiheki types 1 to 10 are closely related to the kinematic characteristics of a particular lumbar vertebra; types 11 and 12 are somewhat specialised and characterised by an overall acuteness or dullness of sensitivity.

Upwards and Downwards category: Types 1 & 2
L1 vertebrate is important in the movement of people having these Taiheki. When they stand upright and bend themselves forward, they often put their weight on the frontal part of their soles. They are underweight and slender, with a long, firm neck, narrow shoulders, thin chest plate and slight muscle tone in the limbs. When they have a posture in which they bend themselves forward slightly, they often bend their neck and above. They have a straight spine. They tend to wear plain and conservative clothes. Type 1 is more comfortable looking up when placing feet on a desk and hands around the neck; Type 2 is more comfortable looking down. They tend to have smaller breasts in women. Right and wrong, praise and blame, are central to their sensitivity. They value reputation and honour. They are good at constructing and telling logic. About their high linguistic ability, they are sensitive to words and highly susceptible to verbal suggestions. Hence, they often become ill or healthy simply due to their assumption or other person's words. They are realistic and interesting in their conversations. They require long sleep and often have a dream about the story. They are very sensitive to lack of sleep and worry a lot about it. Because they persist in good reason, truth, and rules, they cannot take action without having good enough reason for themselves. They tend to overview the world as if from the viewpoint of heaven, and have high metacognitive ability. Thus, Noguchi said that people with the Upwards and Downwards category are the least wild, and like Xian/Sennin/Hsien (in Taoism), Xian is believed to live in a high mountain, or heaven immortal and have some magical power. Noguchi meant that people of these Taiheki live in an imaginary world with an overview of the natural world. They like books and studying from childhood and listen well to adults, so they often honour students. They believe that emotions are below reason and should be controlled by reason, so when they see someone being overwhelmed by emotions, they think it is a pity. They tend to like the colour blue. They are elegant.

Taiheki type 1 has a strong tendency of cerebral sublimating of surplus energy into the intellectual activity. They turn their energy into thoughts. They are sympathetic and left-brain dominant. They tend to have naturally curly hair. They have long faces and broad foreheads. When they walk, they do not lift their knees high, and their steps are wide. They stretch upwards when surprised. They like to read and are happy to increase their knowledge. They like to know the meaning of words they have never heard before. They like history, philosophy, etc. They come up with many ideas, so they talk in the order in which they come up with them, and the topics change rapidly. They talk without reading between the lines and talk about difficult things. They know a lot, and when you ask them about something, they start with its history and go on and on about it. They do not get angry if you interrupt them. They can answer a question out of the blue and are very good at improvising. They are always calm but blush easily when they are embarrassed. They make up systems and rules and get angry when these are broken. When they look up and give a blank look, they are daydreaming. People with this Taiheki always try to understand the world linguistically. That is to say, they have an intense motivation to understand everything by explaining it in their own words. They have a high capacity for language. They are good at using their minds, speaking and writing. They write well, with sound reasoning and thought. They have a large vocabulary. They like to think about something new actively and can plan things in an orderly way, but, just getting an idea of results during their consideration, they often become satisfied quickly and lose their motivation to do it for real. They say they will do something that they clearly cannot do, and then they do not do it. They are good at seeing and organising things objectively. They love to know theories and mechanisms. They are good at creating new theories from a wealth of information. When they have surplus energy, they tend to ponder more and become less active than usual. When you need to scold a person with Taiheki type 1, Noguchi recommended saying things shortly to encourage his/her thinking. If you give lengthy scolding, they would regard you as stupid. When they listen to music, they are more likely to pay attention to the melody. They can get your jokes. They are good at memorising maps. They usually live long life. They will not go dim if they keep using their brains until they die. They are not so obsessive about eating, and they are not afraid to eat the same thing every day or skip meals. They often dream of flying and are more likely to remember their dreams. They want to be elite, and they want social status. They are authoritarian and value tradition, prestige and history. They tend to measure value in terms of authoritative things such as names, titles, brands, positions, status, education, family history, etc. They are labellers. They are weak in their actual performance. They are great at logic and critiquing, but they are no better when you get them to do it. They are good at getting others to do things. They are sluggish when they see others do it, but even less so when they do it themselves. They are not good at practical use and application, and they get lost in thought. They do not want results. They are insensitive to emotions. They do not care about other people's feelings. They tend to be seduced by esoteric language from others. They are vulnerable to criticism and quickly won over by praise. They value hierarchy, manners and etiquette, pride, dignity and greetings. If someone fails to do so, they frown. They use the words "should" and "must" a lot, and they want to be the ones to tell others what to do. They are stubborn people who have their own opinions and do not change easily, but they will obey orders from the absolute top. They do not listen to the opinions of those whom they regard as inferior in position or intelligence. It is said that most men have Taiheki type 1 to some extent, and many characteristics accepted to be typical of men can thus be understood as a part of features of Taiheki type 1. They are often academics, professors, politicians, lawyers, managers, administrators, bankers, writers and professional chess players. When fatigued, their necks become tense, T5 (5th thoracic vertebrae) rises and appears strong, and L1 (1st lumbar vertebrae) becomes rigid. They stretch their bodies to relieve fatigue. They will have a contraction of the back of the neck and a raised chin when the tension continues. They start to have pain in the back of their neck. They start to move their neck up and down. They will not feel that they have thought it all through, no matter how much they think about it. When they feel well, they are able to put things into a few words, but this is no longer possible, and their minds are constantly working. They also lose their libido when they are thinking about difficult things. They lose their sense of reality and become buried in the world of abstractions. They lose the ability to understand things that are not directly expressed in words. Their jaws become tense, and their heads become tired.
Taiheki type 2 has a habitual tendency to sublimation the diencephalon, hypersensitivity of the diencephalon, and cerebral tension that easily evokes physical changes. They are parasympathetic dominance and right-brain dominance. They often have a precipitous back of the head and prominent cheekbones on the face. They have a neck shaped like a mountain ridge when viewed from the front, and when viewed from the side, their neck extends forward like a showerhead. They have no strength in their necks. They walk with slightly outstretched legs and bent knees. They look down when they think. When they are stuck in thinking, that is soon reflected by physical problems, such as stomachache. They feel difficulty taking action under their responsibility and decision, while they feel at ease when taking action according to opinions of, or under the responsibility of, others. They are passive and mindful of what others think. They are relieved when people tell them what to do. They are comfortable doing the same things as others. They are not outspoken. They are cautious and reserved. They are receptive to gossip and written material, and once they are in, they are challenging to correct. They are very presumptive. They excel at paperwork but may only work according to manuals. They follow the rules and instructions to the letter and have a strong desire for recognition and approval for following them. They are polite, regular, serious, disciplined, and work for the good of the world. They are accurate in their work. They are sensible, and they behave in a way that is not embarrassing to the world and attracts praise. They think that their common sense is the right one. They are ashamed to be selfish or to show themselves. They listen well to their parents, teachers and superiors. They are faithful to the basics, to duty, and obedient. They can be powerful when they follow the norms and the path. They are brilliant, hard-working people who can do what they have planned. They are diligent and erudite. They are highly analytical and able to process information. They are intelligent. They prepare carefully and simulate different cases. They are good at imitating and passing on. They pay attention to their subordinates and others under them. They cannot say anything that others do not like. They cannot refuse a request. They are relaxed and amicable among their people, but outside they hide their true intentions and are sober and do not speak their minds. They may prefer a simple life. They do not live a glamorous life, even when they are successful. They draw their communication from a manual in their brain that says, "If you say this, I will say that." They are more comfortable working in a seniority-based system than a performance-based or merit-based system. They are good at connecting people with other people. They understand the characteristics of people and can keep a reasonable distance. They listen to people fairly. They are good at long-distance running in athletics. They can speak well if they are prepared in advance but feel uncomfortable without a script. They are not good at improvisation. They are less likely to move quickly in a crisis. They are the best sycophants in the world. They tend to be sneaky. They are not good at originality or resourcefulness or at making unprecedented decisions. They are slow to make decisions about new things. They can be cynical in adolescence and delight in confusing others. They like thinking, but they are more imaginative than verbal, and often get stuck when trying to understand things with their own words. They are constantly sorting things out in their heads. They have no conclusions. They are good at remembering exactly what others have thought. They tend to feel busy and anxious about things that come from outside and are often busy thinking about and dealing with this and that. They tend to have a sweet tooth. They are also the most attached to their families. They are delusional, fanciful and have a limitless imagination. They get more and more anxious when bad fantasies start and get caught up in the negative thoughts that go around in their head. When they think about the future, they always struggle with vicious delusions in their heads. They are good at making up stories because they are good at imagining things. They can quickly let their thoughts show on their faces. They forget that they even had such feelings about things they used to hate. They do not talk about themselves much and try to be harmless. They are more receptive to Confucian values. They value ethics and morality. They seek order and stability. They are conservative and do not like new ideas. They do not want to cause trouble, are sensitive to shame, do not want to be laughed at, and necessary not to make mistakes. They think that all that matters is that things go well. They like history, drawing, cosplay, etc. They like to get into a story and become the main character in it to feel as if they have experienced it. They can have a strong sense of realism in a fictional world. They tend to dream of falling into a hole. They can think that the best thing to do is graduate from a good university, join a good company and work steadily. They lose their appetite when people say dirty words to them. They are among the most likely to work for a company and become emotionally ill. They read the other person's words too deeply, and as a result, they sometimes hate the other person. They are vulnerable to strong emotions from others. They are often bureaucrats, prosecutors, accountants, bankers, booksellers, curators, announcers, salespeople, assistants, secretaries, store clerks, messengers, actors, and cartoonists. When fatigued, their cerebral reflexes become hyperactive. Their neck relaxes and the pubic bone begins to protrude. Their anterior rib drops and their T5 (5th thoracic vertebra) drops. Their L5 (5th lumbar vertebra) becomes rigid. The Sternocleidomastoid muscle on the side of the neck becomes painful when they are tired. They become tenser in the vagus nerve, more prone to gastric hyperacidity, or more often to tension in the temples and frontal region. They will want to put their feet up on the chair. Their cheeks become hollow and their necks stiff. They lose the ability to distinguish between essential and minor matters and feel that everything is important. They start to try to please everyone and make strange compromises. They become nauseous. Their stomach is affected, and they end up with stomach ulcers.

Leftwards and Rightwards category: Types 3 & 4

Forwards and Backwards category: Types 5 & 6

Twisted category: Types 7 & 8

Type 8 has a sturdy body with strong hips.

Closing and Opening category: Types 9 & 10

Type 11, hypersensitive response type

Type 12, sluggish response type

See also 
 subconscious
 Personality psychology
 Temperament
 Stereotype
 Cold reading

References 

   10. Laura López Coto Seitai Inteligencia Vital

External links 
 Zensei publications
 Seitai Katsugen 

Personality
Stereotypes
Japanese words and phrases